Novius breviuscula is a species of lady beetle native to India, Sri Lanka and Myanmar.

Description
Body length is about 3.25 to 5.5 mm. Body hemispherical. Body color dark brownish red both dorsally and ventrally. Body with greyish white or light yellow pubescence. There are fine, close and shallow punctures on head and pronotum. In male, the sixth abdominal sternite is fairly deeply emarginate at the apex. In female however, the sixth abdominal sternite is entire.

Biology
It is a predator of Maconellicoccus hirsutus.

References 

Coccinellidae
Insects of Sri Lanka
Beetles described in 1892